Ray Sefo (born 15 February 1971) is a New Zealand fight promoter and retired kickboxer, boxer, and mixed martial artist of Samoan descent. He was the K-1 World Grand Prix 2000 Runner Up, is a six-time Muay Thai World Champion, and was an eight time K-1 World Grand Prix Finals tournament participant. He is the president of MMA promotion Professional Fighters League. In kickboxing, he defeated world champions Jerome Le Banner, Peter Aerts, Stefan Leko, Mike Bernardo, and Mark Hunt. He is widely considered to be one of the greatest heavyweight kickboxers to have never won the K-1 World Grand Prix.

Background

Training in Wing Chun as a youth, Sefo moved to Muay Thai under Thai fighting legend Kiosot, then continued training under Lollo Heimuli at the infamous Balmoral Lee Gar Gym.

Career

Early career 
Sefo had an impressive unbeaten record as an amateur and a professional in the Oceania kickboxing league. Early in his career, he trained at Balmoral Lee Gar gym alongside Jason Suttie, Jayson Vemoa, Doug Viney, John Conway, and his brother, Rony Sefo. In 1996, Ray Sefo fought Andre Mannaart in a kickboxing match and overwhelmed Manaart with devastating speed and elusive footwork, knocking him down on numerous occasions. In the ring after the fight, Mannaart took the microphone and said, "...you should call him Sugarfist, not Sugarfoot..." Sefo's first major breakthrough was becoming a WKA Cruiserweight Champion. He also acted as a sparring partner for fellow New Zealander David Tua, when Tua first returned to New Zealand for a fight after turning pro.

K-1 
Sefo made his K-1 debut against future four-time World Grand Prix Champion, Ernesto Hoost. Sefo held his own against the much more experienced Hoost but was finally knocked out in the 4th round by a leg kick. Sefo gained respect for standing up to such an elite fighter in just his first fight. Sefo gained more respect in his third K-1 fight where he knocked out K-1 legend Jerome Lebanner in the 1st round. Sefo's hard right hand was enough to break the Frenchman's jaw in four places.

Sefo had an up and down first few years in K-1, unable to make it past the quarter finals in the K-1 World Grand Prix against the likes of Sam Greco and Andy Hug. In 2000, he made it to the WGP final after knocking out Japanese star Musashi and French kickboxer Cyril Abidi, before losing again to Hoost. In 2002, Sefo defeated Dutch legend Peter Aerts in the quarter finals but lost again to his nemesis Hoost in the semi-finals.

In 2007, Sefo was thought to be a legitimate challenger to dethrone four-time World Grand Prix Champion Semmy Schilt for the new Super Heavyweight title. In the 1st round, Sefo became only the second man in history to knock Schilt down. However, he would go on to lose by KO in the second round. He went on to lose five more fights and would not find the winners circle again until he beat Choi Hong-man, Yosuke Nishijima, and Ionut Iftimoaie, all by decision.

Sefo was then asked to fight at the K-1 World Grand Prix 2010 in Seoul Final 16 on ten days notice against Tyrone Spong. Sefo put up a decent fight on short preparation but was beaten by decision.

MMA and retirement
In mid-February 2011, Sefo had his third MMA fight in a reserve fight for the Strikeforce Heavyweight tournament. He fought Valentijn Overeem, brother of Alistair Overeem, the 2010 K-1 World Grand Prix champion. Overeem had 50 MMA fights behind him and beat Sefo by submission in the first round. Sefo's striking on the feet looked good, but as an inexperienced grappler, he lost early on by neck crank.

On 12 June 2013, Sefo announced that he would return to fighting. At WSOF 3, Sefo announced that he would be facing Dave Huckaba. The two fought at World Series of Fighting 4 on 10 August 2013. Sefo lost the fight via TKO in the second round. In an interview in April 2015, Sefo said, "I actually made a promise to myself that this year will be my last year." He did not fight again after losing against Huckaba. While he considered fighting again, Sefo officially announced his retirement in 2018.

Executive career 
Sefo is the current president of MMA promotion Professional Fighters League. He was named president when the promotion was still known as World Series of Fighting. He helped the promotion ink a deal with NBC Sports to air 8 to 10 events on its network.

Titles
 K-1
 2000 K-1 World Grand Prix 2000 Runner Up.
 World Kickboxing Association
 1997 WKA World Super Heavyweight World Champion.
 World Muay Thai Federation
 1996 WMTF World Heavyweight Champion.
 1992 WMTF World Light Heavyweight Champion.
 International Sport Karate Association
 1996 ISKA World Super Cruiserweight Champion.
 1995 ISKA World Cruiserweight Champion.
 1994 ISKA World Light Cruiserweight Champion.
 Regional
 1992 South Pacific Cruiserweight Champion.
 1991 New Zealand Cruiserweight Champion.
 1990 New Zealand Heavyweight Champion.

Personal life
Sefo lives in Las Vegas, Nevada, and continues to train out of Xtreme Couture Mixed Martial Arts.

Kickboxing record (Incomplete)

|-  bgcolor="#FFBBBB"
| 2012-03-10 || Loss ||align=left| Mirko Cro Cop || Cro Cop Final Fight || Zagreb, Croatia || Decision (Unanimous) || 3 || 3:00 || 56-22-1 
|-  bgcolor="#FFBBBB"
| 2010-10-02 || Loss ||align=left| Tyrone Spong || K-1 World Grand Prix 2010 in Seoul Final 16 ||Seoul, South Korea || Decision (Unanimous) || 3 || 3:00 || 56-21-1
|-
! style=background:white colspan=9 |
|-
|-  bgcolor="#CCFFCC"
| 2010-05-21 || Win ||align=left| Ionuţ Iftimoaie || K-1 World Grand Prix 2010 in Bucharest ||Bucharest, Romania ||Decision (Unanimous) || 3 || 3:00 || 56-20-1
|- bgcolor="#CCFFCC"
| 2009-12-31 || Win ||align=left| Yosuke Nishijima || Dynamite!! 2009 || Saitama, Japan || Decision (Unanimous) || 3 || 3:00 || 55-20-1 
|- bgcolor="#CCFFCC"
| 2008-12-06 || Win ||align=left| Choi Hong-man || K-1 World Grand Prix 2008 Final || Yokohama, Japan || Decision (Unanimous) || 3 || 3:00 || 54-20-1
|- bgcolor="#FFBBBB"
| 2008-09-27 || Loss ||align=left| Gokhan Saki || K-1 World Grand Prix 2008 in Seoul Final 16 || Seoul, Korea || Ext.R Decision || 4 || 3:00 || 53-20-1
|-
! style=background:white colspan=9 |
|-
|- bgcolor="#FFBBBB"
| 2008-07-13 || Loss ||align=left| Zabit Samedov || K-1 World Grand Prix 2008 in Taipei || Taipei City, Taiwan || 2nd Ext.R Decision (Split) || 5 || 3:00 || 53-19-1
|-
|- bgcolor="#FFBBBB"
| 2008-04-13 || Loss ||align=left| Badr Hari || K-1 World Grand Prix 2008 in Yokohama || Yokohama, Japan || TKO (Referee Stoppage) || 1 || 2:43 || 53-18-1
|-
|- bgcolor="#FFBBBB"
| 2007-09-29 || Loss ||align=left| Peter Aerts || K-1 World Grand Prix 2007 in Seoul Final 16 || Seoul, South Korea || TKO (Corner Stoppage) || 1 || 3:00|| 53-17-1
|-
! style=background:white colspan=9 |
|-
|- bgcolor="#FFBBBB"
| 2007-08-11 || Loss ||align=left| Bjorn Bregy || K-1 World Grand Prix 2007 in Las Vegas || Las Vegas, Nevada, USA || Decision (Split) || 3 || 3:00 || 53-16-1
|-
|- bgcolor="#FFBBBB"
| 2007-03-04 || Loss ||align=left| Semmy Schilt || K-1 World Grand Prix 2007 in Yokohama || Yokohama, Japan || KO (Punch) || 2 || 0:26 || 53-15-1
|-
! style=background:white colspan=9 |
|-
|- bgcolor="#CCFFCC"
| 2006-12-02 || Win ||align=left| Melvin Manhoef || K-1 World Grand Prix 2006 Final || Tokyo, Japan || KO (Right Hook) || 1 || 0:40 || 53-14-1
|-
|- bgcolor="#FFBBBB"
| 2006-09-30 || Loss ||align=left| Stefan Leko || K-1 World Grand Prix 2006 in Osaka Opening Round || Osaka, Japan || Ext.R Decision (Unanimous) || 4 || 3:00 || 52-14-1
|-
! style=background:white colspan=9 |
|-
|- bgcolor="#CCFFCC"
| 2006-08-12 || Win ||align=left| Azem Maksutaj || K-1 World Grand Prix 2006 in Las Vegas II || Las Vegas, Nevada, USA || TKO (Referee Stoppage) || 3 || 2:02 || 52-13-1
|-
|- bgcolor="#CCFFCC"
| 2006-06-03 || Win ||align=left| Ruslan Karaev || K-1 World Grand Prix 2006 in Seoul || Seoul, South Korea || KO (Right Hook) || 1 || 1:42 || 51-13-1
|-
|- bgcolor="#CCFFCC"
| 2006-03-05 || Win ||align=left| Francois Botha || K-1 World Grand Prix 2006 in Auckland || Auckland, New Zealand || Decision (Unanimous) || 3 || 3:00 || 50-13-1
|-
|- bgcolor="#FFBBBB"
| 2005-11-19 || Loss ||align=left| Semmy Schilt || K-1 World Grand Prix 2005 Final || Tokyo, Japan || Decision (Unanimous) || 3 || 3:00 || 49-13-1
|-
|- bgcolor="#CCFFCC"
| 2005-09-23 || Win ||align=left| Kaoklai Kaennorsing || K-1 World Grand Prix 2005 in Osaka - Final Elimination || Osaka, Japan || Decision (Unanimous) || 3 || 3:00 || 49-12-1
|-
! style=background:white colspan=9 |
|-
|- bgcolor="#CCFFCC"
| 2005-06-14 || Win ||align=left| Ruslan Karaev || K-1 World Grand Prix 2005 in Hiroshima || Hiroshima, Japan || TKO (Referee Stoppage) || 1 || 0:37 || 48-12-1
|-
|- bgcolor="#CCFFCC"
| 2004-12-31 || Win ||align=left| Gary Goodridge || K-1 PREMIUM 2004 Dynamite!! || Osaka, Japan || KO (Right Uppercuts) || 1 || 0:24 || 47-12-1
|-
|- bgcolor="#FFBBBB"
| 2004-11-04 || Loss ||align=left| Musashi || K-1 World Grand Prix 2004 Final || Tokyo, Japan || Ext.R Decision (Unanimous) || 4 || 3:00 || 46-12-1
|-
|- bgcolor="#CCFFCC"
| 2004-09-25 || Win ||align=left| Hiromi Amada || K-1 World Grand Prix 2004 Final Elimination || Tokyo, Japan || Decision (Unanimous) || 3 || 3:00 || 46-11-1
|-
! style=background:white colspan=9 |
|-
|- bgcolor="#CCFFCC"
| 2004-08-07 || Win ||align=left| Marvin Eastman || K-1 World Grand Prix 2004 in Las Vegas II || Las Vegas, Nevada, USA || TKO (Referee Stoppage) || 1 || 1:32 || 45-11-1
|-
|- bgcolor="#CCFFCC"
| 2004-06-26 || Win ||align=left| Bob Sapp || K-1 Beast 2004 in Shizuoka || Shizuoka, Japan || KO || 2 || 0:29 || 44-11-1
|-
|- bgcolor="#FFBBBB"
| 2003-12-06 || Loss ||align=left| Musashi || K-1 World Grand Prix 2003 Final || Tokyo, Japan || Decision (Unanimous) || 3 || 3:00 || 43-11-1
|-
|- bgcolor="#CCFFCC"
| 2003-10-11 || Win ||align=left| Carter Williams || K-1 World Grand Prix 2003 Final Elimination || Osaka, Japan || Decision (Majority) || 3 || 3:00 || 43-10-1
|-
! style=background:white colspan=9 |
|-
|- bgcolor="#CCFFCC"
| 2003-07-13 || Win ||align=left| Tatsufumi Tomihira || K-1 World Grand Prix 2003 in Fukuoka || Fukuoka, Japan || TKO (Corner Stoppage) || 5 || 2:15 || 42-10-1
|-
|- bgcolor="#CCFFCC"
| 2003-03-30 || Win ||align=left| Pelé Reid || K-1 World Grand Prix 2003 in Saitama || Saitama, Japan || TKO (Corner Stoppage) || 3 || 1:15 || 41-10-1
|-
|- bgcolor="#FFBBBB"
| 2002-12-07 || Loss ||align=left| Ernesto Hoost || K-1 World Grand Prix 2002 Final || Tokyo, Japan || TKO (Shin Injury) || 1 || 1:49 || 40-10-1
|-
|- bgcolor="#CCFFCC"
| 2002-12-07 || Win ||align=left| Peter Aerts || K-1 World Grand Prix 2002 Final || Tokyo, Japan || Decision (Split) || 3 || 3:00 || 40-9-1
|-
|- bgcolor="#CCFFCC"
| 2002-10-05 || Win ||align=left| Martin Holm || K-1 World Grand Prix 2002 Final Elimination || Saitama, Japan || Decision (Majority) || 3 || 3:00 || 39-9-1
|-
! style=background:white colspan=9 |
|-
|- bgcolor="#CCFFCC"
| 2002-07-14 || Win ||align=left| Gilbert Yvel || K-1 World Grand Prix 2002 in Fukuoka || Fukuoka, Japan || KO (Low Kicks) || 2 || 2:07 || 38-9-1
|-
|- bgcolor="#CCFFCC"
| 2002-06-02 || Win ||align=left| Julio Cesar Santana || K-1 Survival 2002 || Toyama, Japan || KO (Right Hook) || 1 || 0:37 || 37-9-1
|-
|- bgcolor="#CCFFCC"
| 2002-03-03 || Win ||align=left| Mike Bernardo || K-1 World Grand Prix 2002 in Nagoya || Nagoya, Japan || Decision (Unanimous) || 5 || 3:00 || 36-9-1
|-
|- bgcolor="#CCFFCC"
| 2001-10-08 || Win ||align=left| Mark Hunt || K-1 World Grand Prix 2001 in Fukuoka || Fukuoka, Japan || Decision (Unanimous) || 3 || 3:00 || 35-9-1
|-
|- bgcolor="#FFBBBB"
| 2001-06-24 || Loss ||align=left| Remy Bonjasky || K-1 Survival 2001 || Sendai, Japan || Ext.R TKO (Corner Stoppage) || 4 || 3:00 || 34-9-1
|-
|- bgcolor="#CCFFCC"
| 2001-04-29 || Win ||align=left| Adam Watt || K-1 World Grand Prix 2001 in Osaka || Osaka, Japan || TKO (Right Hook) || 1 || 2:20 || 34-8-1
|-
|- bgcolor="#CCFFCC"
| 2001-03-17 || Win ||align=left| Michael McDonald || K-1 Gladiators 2001 || Yokohama, Japan || KO (Right Hook) || 1 || 1:56 || 33-8-1
|-
|- bgcolor="#FFBBBB"
| 2000-12-10 || Loss ||align=left| Ernesto Hoost || K-1 World Grand Prix 2000 Final || Tokyo, Japan || Decision (Unanimous) || 3 || 3:00 || 32-8-1
|-
! style=background:white colspan=9 |
|-
|- bgcolor="#CCFFCC"
| 2000-12-10 || Win ||align=left| Cyril Abidi || K-1 World Grand Prix 2000 Final || Tokyo, Japan || TKO (Referee Stoppage) || 1 || 1:45 || 32-7-1
|-
|- bgcolor="#CCFFCC"
| 2000-12-10 || Win ||align=left| Musashi || K-1 World Grand Prix 2000 Final || Tokyo, Japan || TKO (Referee Stoppage) || 1 || 1:38 || 31-7-1
|-
|- bgcolor="#FFBBBB"
| 2000-08-20 || Loss ||align=left| Cyril Abidi || K-1 World Grand Prix 2000 in Yokohama || Yokohama, Japan || TKO (Corner Stoppage) || 2 || 3:00 || 30-7-1
|-
|- bgcolor="#CCFFCC"
| 2000-08-20 || Win ||align=left| Frank Otto || K-1 World Grand Prix 2000 in Yokohama || Yokohama, Japan || TKO (Referee Stoppage) || 1 || 2:24 || 30-6-1
|-
|- bgcolor="#FFBBBB"
| 2000-08-20 || Loss ||align=left| Peter Aerts || K-1 The Millennium || Osaka, Japan || KO (Right Low Kick) || 3 || 2:24 || 29-6-1
|-
|- bgcolor="#FFBBBB"
| 1999-12-05 || Loss ||align=left| Sam Greco || K-1 World Grand Prix 1999 Final Quarter Finals || Tokyo, Japan || Decision (Unanimous) || 3 || 3:00 || 29-5-1
|-
|- bgcolor="#CCFFCC"
| 1999-10-03 || Win ||align=left| Samir Benazzouz || K-1 World Grand Prix '99 Opening Round || Osaka, Japan || TKO (Referee Stoppage) || 1 || 2:14 || 29-4-1
|-
! style=background:white colspan=9 |
|-
|- bgcolor="#CCFFCC"
| 1999-06-06 || Win ||align=left| Jim Mullen || K-1 Survival '99 || Sapporo, Japan || KO (Right Hook) || 2 || 0:45 || 28-4-1
|-
|- bgcolor="#FFBBBB"
| 1999-04-25 || Loss ||align=left| Andy Hug || K-1 Revenge '99 || Yokohama, Japan || TKO (Corner Stoppage) || 4 || 3:00 || 27-4-1
|-
|- bgcolor="#FFBBBB"
| 1998-12-13 || Loss ||align=left| Andy Hug || K-1 World Grand Prix 1998 Final Quarter Finals || Tokyo, Japan || TKO (Referee Stoppage/Two Knockdowns) || 2 || 2:28 || 27-3-1
|-
|- bgcolor="#CCFFCC"
| 1998-09-27 || Win ||align=left| Stefan Leko || K-1 World Grand Prix '98 Opening Round || Osaka, Japan || Decision (Unanimous) || 5 || 3:00 || 27-2-1
|-
! style=background:white colspan=9 |
|-
|- bgcolor="#FFBBBB"
| 1998-05-24 || Loss ||align=left| Matt Skelton || K-1 Braves '98 || Fukuoka, Japan || TKO (Corner Stoppage) || 2 || 3:00 || 26-2-1
|-
|- bgcolor="#c5d2ea"
| 1998-04-09 || Draw ||align=left| Francisco Filho || K-1 Kings '98 || Yokohama, Japan || Draw || 5 || 3:00 || 26-1-1
|-
|- bgcolor="#CCFFCC"
| 1998-01-23 || Win ||align=left| Stephane Reveillon || N/A || N/A || KO || 2 || N/A || 26-1
|-
! style=background:white colspan=9 |
|-
|- bgcolor="#CCFFCC"
| 1997-10-00 || Win ||align=left| Jean-Claude Leuyer || N/A || N/A || Decision || 5 || 3:00 || 25-1
|-
|- bgcolor="#CCFFCC"
| 1997-07-20 || Win ||align=left| Jean-Claude Leuyer || K-1 Dream '97 || Nagoya, Japan || Decision (Unanimous) || 7 || 3:00 || 24-1
|-
! style=background:white colspan=9 |
|-
|- bgcolor="#CCFFCC"
| 1997-04-29 || Win ||align=left| Jérôme Le Banner || K-1 Braves '97 || Fukuoka, Japan || KO (Right Hook) || 1 || 1:31 || 23-1
|-
|- bgcolor="#CCFFCC"
| 1997-03-16 || Win ||align=left| Petar Majstorovic || K-1 Kings '97 || Yokohama, Japan || TKO (Referee Stoppage) || 4 || 1:36 || 22-1
|-
|- bgcolor="#FFBBBB"
| 1996-12-08 || Loss ||align=left| Ernesto Hoost || K-1 Hercules '96 || Nagoya, Japan || KO (Low Kicks) || 4 || 0:25 || 21-1
|-
|- bgcolor="#CCFFCC"
| 1996-09-09 || Win ||align=left| Kirkwood Walker || N/A || Hong Kong || KO || N/A || N/A || 21-0
|-
! style=background:white colspan=9 |
|-
|- bgcolor="#CCFFCC"
| 1996-08-01 || Win ||align=left| Lee Swaney || New Zealand vs England || Auckland, New Zealand || KO || N/A || N/A || 20-0
|-
|- bgcolor="#CCFFCC"
| 1996-02-25 || Win ||align=left| Andre Mannaart || NZ - AUS - HOL || Auckland, New Zealand || KO (Punches) || 4 || N/A || 19-0
|-
! style=background:white colspan=9 |
|-
|- bgcolor="#CCFFCC"
| 1995-08-25 || Win ||align=left| Michael McDonald || N/A || Auckland, New Zealand || KO (Right Hook) || 3 || N/A || 18-0
|-
! style=background:white colspan=9 |
|-
|- bgcolor="#CCFFCC"
| 1995-04-27 || Win ||align=left| Rob Martin || N/A || Auckland, New Zealand || KO (Left Hook) || 1 || N/A || 17-0
|-
! style=background:white colspan=9 |
|-

|-
|- bgcolor="#FFBBBB"
| 2001-09-02 || Loss ||align=left| Chester Hughes || Elgin, Illinois, USA || KO || 1 || N/A || 5–1
|-
|- bgcolor="#CCFFCC"
| 2001-06-03 || Win ||align=left| Joe Lenhart || Elgin, Illinois, USA || TKO || 1 || N/A || 5–0
|-
|- bgcolor="#CCFFCC"
| 2001-02-11 || Win ||align=left| Steve Griffin || Elgin, Illinois, USA || TKO || 1 || N/A || 4–0 
|-
|- bgcolor="#CCFFCC"
| 1996-10-05 || Win ||align=left| Nicky Faamata || Auckland, New Zealand || TKO || 3 || N/A || 3–0
|-
|- bgcolor="#CCFFCC"
| 1995-03-16 || Win ||align=left| Paul Baker || Auckland, New Zealand || PTS || 4 || N/A || 2–0
|-
|- bgcolor="#CCFFCC"
| 1994-11-24 || Win ||align=left| Alex Katu || Auckland, New Zealand || TKO || 1 || N/A || 1–0 
|-
| colspan=9 | Legend:

Mixed martial arts record

|-
| Loss
| align=center| 2–2
| Dave Huckaba
| TKO (punches)
| WSOF 4
| 
| align=center| 2
| align=center| 4:32
| Ontario, California, United States
| 
|-
| Loss
| align=center| 2–1
| Valentijn Overeem
| Submission (baseball choke)
| Strikeforce: Fedor vs. Silva
| 
| align=center| 1
| align=center| 1:37
| East Rutherford, New Jersey, United States
| 
|-
| Win
| align=center| 2–0
| Kevin Jordan
| Submission (knee injury)
| Strikeforce Challengers: Kennedy vs. Cummings
| 
| align=center| 2
| align=center| 0:24
| Bixby, Oklahoma, United States
| 
|-
| Win
| align=center| 1–0
| Kim Min-soo
| KO (head kick)
| Hero's 2
| 
| align=center| 2
| align=center| 0:30
| Tokyo, Japan
|

See also 
List of current WSOF fighters
List of male kickboxers
List of K-1 events
Champions of Champions Elite

References

External links
Profile at K-1
Ray Sefo Interview

1971 births
Living people
Boxers from Auckland
Cruiserweight kickboxers
Fighters trained by Lolo Heimuli
Heavyweight boxers
Heavyweight kickboxers
Heavyweight mixed martial artists
Kickboxing commentators
Kickboxing trainers
Light heavyweight kickboxers
New Zealand expatriate sportspeople in the United States
New Zealand male boxers
New Zealand male kickboxers
New Zealand male mixed martial artists
Mixed martial artists utilizing boxing
Mixed martial artists utilizing kickboxing
Mixed martial artists utilizing Muay Thai
Mixed martial artists utilizing wrestling
New Zealand Māori sportspeople
New Zealand Muay Thai practitioners
Sportspeople from Auckland